"Who's Gonna Follow You Home?" is a song written by Norell Oson Bard and performed by Swedish singer Jerry Williams on the 1990 album Jerry Williams live på Börsen, released as a single in 1990.

Cover versions 
A Swedish-language version, with lyrics by Keith Almgren, called "Vem får följa dig hem" (eng. "Who's gonna follow you home") has been recorded by Shanes for the 1990 album "60-talsparty Let's Dance 1" as well as released as a single that year, and covered by Mats Bergmans (on the 1991 album Mats Bergmans), Grönwalls (on the 1993 album Waikiki Beach), and Matz Bladhs.

Shanes scored a Svensktoppen hit with the song, charting for 44 weeks between 28 October 1990 and 10 November 1991.

Chart positions

References

1990 songs
Jerry Williams (singer) songs
1990 singles
Songs written by Alexander Bard
Songs written by Ola Håkansson
Songs written by Tim Norell